The Chalachitra Prathibha Award is one of the annual awards given at the Kerala Film Critics Association Awards since 1986 for overall contributions to Malayalam cinema.

Winners

See also
 Chalachitra Ratnam Award
 Ruby Jubilee Award

References

Kerala Film Critics Association Awards